Salt Cay Airport  is the public airport serving Salt Cay, the second largest of the Turks Islands in the Turks and Caicos Islands. The facility is also known as Leon Wilson Airport.

History
On 26 June 2017, Salt Cay Airport's Aerodrome Certificate expired, and the Turks & Caicos Islands Civil Aviation Authority chose not to renew it on the basis of safety concerns with the runway and other infrastructure. For example, the runway was still in need of resurfacing. As a result, Caicos Express Airways, the only airline serving Salt Cay Airport at the time, ended all its flights to the airport on 7 July. On 18 August 2017 the TCICAA lifted the restriction on Salt Cay airport. 

Salt Cay airport was closed again in late July 2019 for major upgrades, scheduled to last for 10 weeks, according to in The Turks and Caicos Islands Airports Authority. The airport opening was delayed with upgrades plus repairs, and the facility reopened in October 2020. At the same time, it was also renamed to 'Leon Wilson Airport' in honor of a parliamentarian from Salt Cay.

References

Airports in the Turks and Caicos Islands